Manuel Jacinto Nogueira da Gama (8 September 1765 — 15 February 1847), Marquis of Baependi, was a Brazilian military officer, politician, translator and professor, who received a doctorate in Mathematics and Philosophy from the University of Coimbra.

Biography 
Son of Nicolau Antônio Nogueira and Ana Josefa de Almeida and Gama. His brother José Inácio Nogueira da Gama married Francisca Maria do Vale de Abreu e Melo, baroness of São Mateus, generating from this union a son: Nicolau Antônio Nogueira Vale da Gama, viscount with Nogueira da Gama grandeur. He was the grandson of Tomé Rodrigues Nogueira do Ó, a trunk of the Nogueira family from Baependi, of which several Brazilian politicians belong.

Marriage 
He married on August 7, 1809, Francisca Mônica Carneiro da Costa, daughter of militia colonel Braz Carneiro Leão and Ana Francisca Rosa Maciel da Costa, baroness of São Salvador de Campos de Goitacases. They had four children: Brás Carneiro Nogueira da Costa e Gama (Count of Baependi), Manuel Jacinto Carneiro da Costa and Gama (baron of Juparanã) and Francisco Nicolau Carneiro Nogueira da Costa e Gama (baron with honors of grandeur of Santa Monica), this future son-in-law of the Duke of Caxias. His granddaughter Francisca Jacinta Nogueira da Gama married Antônio Dias Coelho Neto dos Reis (Count of Carapebus). 

The historian Pedro Calmon also descends from it.

Political career 
He held several political positions, mainly during the end of the First Reign and beginnings of the Regency period, such as: deputy of the Constituent Assembly of 1823, having been one of the signatories of the Brazilian Constitution of 1824, senator for Minas Gerais in 1826, president of the province of Rio de Janeiro, president of the Senate in 1838, Minister of Finance in several offices, even in the last of the reign of D. Pedro I. 

As a military man, he came to the rank of field marshal. Great of the Empire, he was an imperial councillor and nobleman-knight. He received the degrees of dignitary of the Imperial Order of the Cruise, Grand Cross of the Imperial Order of the Rose and commander of the Imperial Order of St. Benedict of Avis. He received the viscondado with greatness by decree of 12 October 1824 and the marquisate by decree of 12 October 1826. The title refers to the mining town of Baependi.

References 

Minas Gerais politicians
Empire of Brazil politicians
Brazilian politicians
Brazilian nobility
1847 deaths
1765 births
People from São João del-Rei
University of Coimbra alumni
People from Campos dos Goytacazes